Victor Luiz Pereira Silva (born 3 April 1997) is a Brazilian footballer who plays as a left-back for Ponte Preta.'''

References

External links
 

1997 births
Living people
Brazilian footballers
Brazilian expatriate footballers
Footballers from São Paulo
Association football fullbacks
Associação Desportiva São Caetano players
FC Septemvri Sofia players
Esporte Clube São Bernardo players
Clube do Remo players
Londrina Esporte Clube players
Associação Atlética Ponte Preta players
First Professional Football League (Bulgaria) players
Brazilian expatriate sportspeople in Bulgaria
Expatriate footballers in Bulgaria